The 2013–14 season was Damash's 4th season in the Pro League, and their 3rd consecutive season in the top division of Iranian Football and 6th year in existence as a football club. They also competed in the Hazfi Cup. Damash was captained by Mohammad Reza Mahdavi.

Player

First team squad
Last updated February 11, 2014

Transfers

Summer 

In:

Out:

Winter 

In:

Out:

Competitions

Iran Pro League

Standings

Results by round

Matches

Hazfi Cup

Friendly Matches

Pre-season

Squad statistics

Appearances & goals
Last updated 20 June 2014

|-
|}

Goal scorers
Includes all competitive matches. The list is sorted by shirt number when total goals are equal.

Last updated on 20 June 2014

Friendlies and Pre-season goals are not recognized as competitive match goals.

Coaching staff

|}

Other personnel

See also
 2013–14 Persian Gulf Cup

References

External links
Iran Premier League Statistics
Persian League
  Damash Fans Press Site

Damash Gilan seasons
Damash